Adisorn Saeng-ruang is a professional footballer from Thailand. He played for Nakhon Pathom in the Thailand Premier League.

External links
Profile at Thaipremierleague.co.th

Living people
Adisorn Saeng-ruang
1986 births
Adisorn Saeng-ruang
Adisorn Saeng-ruang
Association football midfielders